Throughout history, women in Iran have played numerous roles, and contributed in many ways, to Iranian society. Historically, tradition maintained that women be confined to their homes so that they could manage the household and raise children. During the Pahlavi era, there was a drastic social change towards women's desegregation: ban of the veil, right to vote, right to education, equal salaries for men and women, and the right to hold public office. Women were active participants in the Islamic Revolution. Iran's constitution, adopted after the Islamic Revolution in 1979, proclaims equality for men and women under Article 20, while mandating legal code adhering to Sharia law. Article 21 of the constitution as well as a few parliament-passed laws give women rights such as women are allowed to drive, hold public office, and attend university but not wearing a veil in public can be punished by law; and when in public, all hair and skin except the face and hands must be covered. However, this is not practiced effectively; particularly in recent years, Iranian women have created many movements to fight back against the restrictive laws by the government and gain back their rights and freedom.

History

Ancient Iran

 
Archaeological excavations at Shahr-e Sukhteh ("Burnt City"), a prehistoric settlement in the Sistan-Baluchistan province of southeastern Iran, have revealed that women in the region during the 4th to 3rd millennium BC possessed high status. Of the seals discovered in graves there, 90% were in possession of women, who made up over 60% of the population. The distribution of these seals – instruments of trade and government which represented economic and administrative control – revealed these women to have been a powerful group in their prehistoric society.

The early Achaemenid-era Persepolis fortification and treasury tablets refers to women in three different terms: mutu, irti and duksis. The first refers to ordinary (non-royal) women; the second to unmarried members of the royal family; and the last duksis to married women of royalty. Such differentiated terminology shows the significance of marital status and of a woman's relationship to the king. The tablets also reveal that women of the royal household traveled extensively and often personally administered their own estates. The queen consort and her ladies-in-waiting are known to have played polo against the emperor and his courtiers. The only limits on the extent of the authority exercised by the king's mother were set by the monarch himself.

In the tablets, "non-royals and the ordinary workers are mentioned by their rank in the specific workgroup or workshops they were employed. The rations they received are based on skill and the level of responsibility they assumed in the workplace. The professions are divided by gender and listed according to the amount of ration. Records indicate that some professions were undertaken by both sexes while others were restricted to either male or female workers. There are male and female supervisors at the mixed workshops as evident by the higher rations they have received with little difference in the number of rations between the two sexes. There are also occasions where women listed in the same category as men received fewer rations and vice versa. Female managers have different titles presumably reflecting their level of skill and rank. The highest-ranking female workers in the texts are called arashshara (great chief). They appear repeatedly in the texts, were employed at different locations, and managed large groups of women, children, and sometimes men working in their units. They usually receive high rations of wine and grains exceeding all the other workers in the unit including the males." Pregnant women also received higher rations than others. Women with newborn children also received extra rations for one month.

A few experts say that it was Cyrus the Great who, twelve centuries before Islam, established the custom of covering women to protect their chastity. According to their theory, the veil passed from the Achaemenids to the Hellenistic Seleucids. They, in turn, handed it to the Byzantines, from whom the Arab conquerors turned it into the hijab, transmitting it over the vast reaches of the Muslim world.

The Sassanid princess Purandokht, daughter of Khosrau II, ruled the Persian empire for almost two years before resigning. During the Sassanian dynasty, many of the Iranian soldiers who were captured by Romans were women who were fighting along with the men.

Persian women are depicted in many masterpieces of Persian miniatures. These are often used as sources to "trace through the sequence of women's fashion from earlier periods".

At the Battle of Ctesiphon (363) the victorious Roman soldiers prized young Persian women, seizing them as war booty.

Islamic periods

Qajar Dynasty
During the Qajar period, women played the role of reserve labor, which was important in the economy. Their work always benefited the family, businesses owner, and the state. Rural and lower-class women were mostly involved in carpet weaving, embroidery, and the production of clothing, textile, butter, fruits, and tea. They also worked in silk and cotton manufacturing as well as other handicrafts. Women were also employed at mortuaries, public bathhouses, and in more affluent houses as maids, wet nurses, and nannies.  In more populous cities women worked as entertainers, dancers, or prostitutes. Although many work opportunities were open for women their wages were lower. Women that worked in textiles during this time period earned an average of one-third of what men did. Even though women were given the ability to earn a wage, they still did not have many rights, it was still possible for rural girls to be sold by the head of their families.

This time period, especially between 1905 and 1911, was the start of women's 'awakening' in Persia. It can be suggested that this awakening can be defined as a women's movement and feminism. Women began to become more involved with the public sphere, and Nasir al-Din Shah's harem participated in the 1891 tobacco revolt. However, it was not just wealthy women who were involved but also the common women. Washerwomen donated savings, along with wealthy women's jewelry contributions, to help sponsor a national bank. The storming of Majilis (parliament) in 1911 by women showed an unprecedented political awareness of women as well as a public action. Generally, there were precedents that restricted women's actions, where they were often portrayed as prisoners because of their gender inferiority.  

Often there is an orientalist view of Qajar women before the revolution. Badr al-Moluk Bamdad, wife of Ahmad Shah Qajar classic work, From Darkness to Light, published two years before the Islamic Revolution (1968-1969) refers to Persian history before the tobacco revolt as "a century of darkness", in which women are "poor creatures" and "powerless dolls" who are secluded from society while being concealed "under thick coverings and dependent like parasites". Bamdad also claimed that women were "prisoners, confined in the home or under the veil and the cloak""

Sima Bahar in an article titled, A Historical Background to the Women's Movement in Iran identified that the constitutional revolution period was the first occasion women participated with men in public action. She considers that during the Qajar period "women's activities were solely limited to the household; if they were active in production at all such as in villages, the production was for the household. Women of the upper class lead an even more secluded life... they were only allowed to go out accompanied by men."

During the Qajar dynasty (1789–1925), Malek Jahan Khanom as queen mother exerted serious political influence during the reign of her son, from 1848 until her death in 1873.

Pahlavi Dynasty

The Pahlavi Shahs were the rulers of Iran between 1925 and 1979 and they introduced many reforms concerning women's rights. An example of an early reform introduced by Reza Shah was the Kashf-e hijab, the "forced unveiling of women by a special decree on January 8, 1936, which, as the name suggests, involved the police force pulling the hijab away even from religious women, by force." Women's involvement in society in general increased. Iranian women increasingly participated in the economy, the education sector, and in the workforce. Levels of literacy were also improved. Examples of women's involvement: women acquired high official positions, such as ministers, artists, judges, scientists, athletes, etc.

Under Reza Shah's successor Mohammad Reza Shah many more significant reforms were introduced. For example, in 1963, the Shah granted female suffrage, and soon after women were elected to the Majlis (the parliament) and the upper house, and appointed as judges and ministers in the cabinet. In 1967 Iranian family law was also reformed which improved the position of women in Iranian society. It was included in the civil code and was designed to protect wives, children and female divorcees. The general thrust of the reforms was to promote equality between men and women in society.

The Family Protection Laws of 1967 and 1973 required a husband to go to court to divorce rather than the proclamation of the triple talaq, "I divorce thee" three times, as stipulated by traditional sharia law. It allowed a wife to initiate divorce and required the first wife's permission for a husband to take a second wife. Child custody was left to new family protection courts rather than automatically granted to the father. The minimum age at which a female could marry was raised from 13 to 15 in 1967 and to 18 in 1975.

Throughout the Pahlavi period, female advancements in education and labor were significant. From 1965 to 1966, the percentage of illiterate women dropped by 11%. However, this decrease in illiteracy had mainly taken place in the urban areas, which saw a decrease of 20% in illiteracy, while rural areas, by contrast, saw a decrease of 3%. This is most likely due to the increase of educational centers and universities across Iranian cities, mainly in Tehran and Abadan, during this time period. The increase in education among females led to an increase in female participation in various labor fields throughout the 1956–1966 period. Women began entering fields such as biology, agricultural studies, medicine, teaching, law, and economics among other fields, giving them more significant political power. In urban centers, the employment of women in Abadan, Tabriz, and Esfahan increased, with the latter two seeing significant increases in female labor. Interestingly during this period, female employment in Tehran dropped slightly.

Islamic Republic of Iran

Following the 1979 Iranian Revolution Iran became an Islamic republic. During the era of the post-Revolution rule, Iranian women had more opportunities in some areas and more restrictions in others. One of the striking features of the revolution was the large-scale participation of women from traditional backgrounds in demonstrations leading up to the overthrow of the monarchy. The Iranian women who had gained confidence and higher education under the Pahlavi era participated in demonstrations against the Shah to topple the monarchy. The culture of education for women was established by the time of the revolution so that even after the revolution, large numbers of women entered civil service and higher education, and, in 1996, 14 women were elected to the Islamic Consultative Assembly.

The leadership of Ayatollah Khomeini led to many paradoxical issues for women. Women gained much influence in certain areas, but still faced many political obstacles to equality with men. For example, women were allowed to serve in the military, often in paramilitary groups, but were restricted in many fields of study in school. After the breakout of the Iran–Iraq War, women continued to gain political power. Women were mobilized both on the front lines and at home in the workplace. They participated in basic infantry roles, but also in intelligence programs and political campaigning. During the height of the Iran-Iraq War, women made up a large portion of the domestic workforce, replacing men who were fighting, injured, or dead.

Khomeini often expressed appreciation for women's issues after he took power. In May 1979, Khomeini addressed his audience and spoke about Fatimah: "After the death of her father, Fatimah (peace be upon her), lived for seventy-five days. She was in this world, overcome with sadness and grief. Gabriel, the Trusted Spirit, came to visit and console her and tell her of future events."  So, according to this tradition, in these seventy-five days that she had contact with Gabriel, he came and went many times. I do not believe that anyone else except the great prophets has had such an experience, in which for seventy-five days Gabriel, the Trusted Spirit, came and went and spoke of things that would take place in the future, that would happen to her ancestors in the future." The Ayatollah spoke fondly of Fatimah as a role model for women. He said that even though she was visited by the Angel Gabriel, this is not what made her special. To him, her admirable qualities were twofold and supposedly represented by the visits from Gabriel: her special spiritual status and her excellent moral character. He continued to explain that Fatimah could have been born with this spiritual status or Fatimah could have gone through a kind of unique mystical experience. This is why the Ayatollah believed she represented the ideal female role model. Fatimah's moral excellence is observed in three interconnected activities: struggle, inspiring men, and suffering. Fatimah inspired her husband as a devout Muslim. Khomeini draws parallels to this inspiration with women of Iran and how they should strive to follow their religious calling like Fatimah.

While during the revolution, the veil was worn and seen as a symbol of protest many women were alarmed when talk of the hijab being compulsory was discussed. This resulted in the International Women's Day Protests in Tehran, 1979 against compulsory hijab. The topic was inflated when Ayatollah Khomeini was quoted to say that he preferred to see women in modest Islamic clothing. In 1981 veiling was made compulsory and cosmetics were banned, harsh punishments were also introduced by the morality police such as the removal of lipstick by a razor blade. In the early 1980s women were banned from acting as judges and were discouraged from becoming lawyers. The Islamic government repealed the Family Protection Laws of 1967 and 1973, which restricted polygamy, allowed women the right to divorce, and raised the minimum age for marriage. The regime banned contraception and lowered the marriage age of girls from 15 to 9. They also banned women from various fields of study and professions.

After the death of Ayatollah Khomeini, many of the restrictions on women were lifted. The government tried to stabilize population growth by distributing contraceptives often for free of charge. This caused the fertility rate to decline from 3.2 to 2.3 children per woman, which was one of the lowest rates in the Middle East.  In 1992, the High Council of the Integration Revolution adopted a set of Employment Policies for women, that encouraged the integration of women into the labor force while still emphasizing the importance of family roles for women.  Women were encouraged to enter gynecology, pharmacology, midwifery, and laboratory work. Although they continued to be prevented by certain professors as 'Islamically inappropriate'. In 1990 the field of law was open to women and they were permitted in the Special Civic Courts, although they cannot serve as judges.

After the death of Khomeini, more practical reforms under President Rafsanjani for women began. Rafsanjani asserted that in Islam, "There are no barriers to the education of women in any field." The three major fields which Rafsanjani focused on were education, family planning, health, and marriage. Statistics from the 1986/87 years show that female admissions into schools of dentistry, audiology, statistics, optometry, radiology, and radiotherapy were on par with men. According to the religious-political leaders, it is believed that a woman in Iran can be both traditional and modern at the same time, this is instilled in the education they receive. Meaning that a woman's central role is in the home, taking care of children, their family and house duties, while also being able to go out into the social world and create a public life but not deteriorating any social standing of her family. The restriction of the home creates a traditional private realm for the woman while the freedom of going out creates a modern social presence. The Islamic Republic had never intended to purposely bind a woman to her home and have her fulfill wifely and motherly duties, however, it is in the religious aspect of the republic that this was done. Islam does not prohibit women from public life however it is the political and cultural climate of Iran that encourages women to practice a private domestic life. Many schools are now inspiring young girls to prepare for tomorrow, as a mother and a wife and as active figures in the involvement of social and political affairs. However, it is evident that the Education Plan of the Islamic Republic has a clear divide between the education taught to boys and girls. This includes introducing the role of responsibility for a family as well as the roles of males and females in marital life. But girls are given the confidence to put themselves out into the education fields that they desire to be in while keeping a personal family life in mind. Aside from education, Rafsanjani greatly focused on family planning and health across Iran, with women playing the central role. Iran's population throughout the 1980s soared despite the Iran–Iraq War, with the birthrate reaching 3.9 in 1983, double the world average. Health clinics for women were established nation-wide; by 1994, there were more than 10,000 health centers in Iran, and once-banned contraceptives were made available to women. In 1986, the Majlis voted to introduce a 12-article law which allowed many marriage rights to women. These rights included prenuptial agreements, a divorced woman's right to a share of the property, and increased alimony rights. In 1992, the Council of Expediency passed a law allowing women who were "unjustly and unfairly" divorced to collect payment from the former husband for services she had performed during the course of the marriage.

By 1999, Iran had 140 female publishers, enough to hold an exhibition of books and magazines published by women.  As of 2005, 65 percent of Iran's university students and 43 percent of its salaried workers were women.  As of early 2007, nearly 70 percent of Iran's science and engineering students are women.

27.1% female ministers in government put Iran among first 23 countries in early 2000s, 2.8–4.9% female parliamentarians in past 15 years put it among least 25 countries. In 2009 Fatemeh Bodaghi became vice president for Legal Affairs and a top advisor to President Mahmoud Ahmedinejad. Maryam Mojtahidzadeh who runs the women's ministry was also selected as an advisor to the president.

At least one observer (Robert D. Kaplan) has commented on the less traditional attitude of many women in Iran compared to other Middle Eastern countries. "In Iran, you could point a camera at a woman... and she would smile" in contrast to other more conservative places where women may mind this.

There are also women in the Iranian police who deal with crimes committed by women and children. According to opinion of Supreme Leader of Iran, Ali Khamenei, giving opportunity for develop woman's talents in the family and society is respecting to the woman.

On May 14, 2019, the Iranian Islamic Consultative Assembly approved an amendment to their nationality law, in which women married to men with a foreign nationality should request to confer nationality on children under age 18, while children and spouses of Iranian men are granted nationality automatically. However, the Guardian Council should approve the amendment. On October 2, 2019, the Guardian Council agreed to sign the bill into a law, taking into account the background checks on foreign fathers.

In August 2019, the FFIRI lifted the ban on Iranian women's entry to football stadiums for the first time in 40 years. On September 8, 2019, Sahar Khodayari self-immolated after being arrested for trying to enter a stadium. Following that incident, FIFA assured that Iranian women are able to attend stadiums starting from October 2019. On October 10, 2019, more than 3,500 women attended the Azadi Stadium for a World Cup qualifier against Cambodia.

Women and Iran's anti-government protests 
The human rights organization Amnesty International has reported that it has received reports of several cases of rape of women and men detainees in Iran's prisons. On January 17, 2020, Raha Bahreini, Amnesty International's special reporter on Iran, revealed a case of sexual assault on an Iranian woman who had been detained in Tehran during the protests that erupted after the downing of a Ukrainian passenger plane.

Politics

Women in Iran were granted the right to vote in 1963. They were first admitted to Iranian universities in 1937. Since then, several women have held high-ranking posts in the government or parliament. Before and after the 1979 revolution, several women were appointed ministers or ambassadors. Farrokhroo Parsa was the first woman to be appointed Minister of Education in 1968 and Mahnaz Afkhami was appointed Minister for Women's Affairs in 1976.

Some, such as Tahereh Saffarzadeh, Masumeh Ebtekar, Azam Taleghani, Fatemeh Haghighatjou, Elaheh Koulaei, Fatemeh Javadi, Marzieh Dabbaq and Zahra Rahnavard came after the revolution. Other Iranian women, such as Goli Ameri and Farah Karimi, hold positions in Western countries.

There are currently 17 women in parliament, of a total of 290 parliamentarians. This was up from nine in the previous elections.

Currently, there are several all-female political organizations active in Iran, including:

Education

The importance of education for Iranian Women is characterized by the main role of what the education can provide directly or indereclty helping them to gain consciousness and skills to fill the gap of gender inequality. It can also be useful to understand the reasons of their injustice and how women can make better their  marginal social positions.

Education held an important role in Iranian society, especially as the nation began a period of modernization under the authority of Reza Shah Pahlavi in the early 20th century when the number of women's schools began to grow. Formal education for women in Iran began in 1907 with the establishment of the first primary school for girls.  By mid-century, legal reforms granting women the right to vote and raising the minimum age for marriage offered more opportunities for women to pursue education outside the home. After periods of imposed restrictions, women's educational attainment continued its rise through the Islamification of education following the Iranian Revolution of 1979, peaking in the years following radical changes such as correcting contraddictions that have marked its educational system, like the curriculum and composition of classrooms. By 1989, women dominated the entrance examinations for college attendance.

Women's participation in education has not slowed despite efforts to impose restrictions on the increasingly female-dominated educational sphere. The changes in women's education have split into increased usage and dominance of the opportunities available to women, and the imposition of strict requirements governing their role in education, including gender-segregated classes, Islamic dress, and the channeling of women into "feminine" majors that prevent the pursuit of certain careers.

Illiteracy among women has been on a decrease since 1970, when it was 54 percent, to the year 2000 when it was 17.30 percent. Iranian female education went from a 46 percent literacy rate, to 83 percent. Iran ranked 10th in terms of female literacy in the 1970s, and still holds this position.

According to a UNESCO world survey, at the primary level of enrollment, Iran has the highest female-to-male ratio in the world among sovereign nations, with a girl-to-boy ratio of 1.22: 1.00. According to UNESCO data from 2012, Iran has more female students in engineering fields than any other country in the world.

The first university Iranian girls could attend was the University of Tehran in 1932.When the universities re-opened in 1982, the Gouvernement made a structural revolution of the courses, eliminating thoses considered unnecessary, like music and conselling, and limitating the women's access to other subjects.  However, girl's attendance in school only occurred after the Islamic revolution in 1979. In 2005, there were 62% university entrees.  Furthermore, the first exam took place after the Cultural Revolution in 1984, 42% of females accepted examinees, and 32% of male applicants and 68% were accepted into the program. In addition, there was an 8% chance for girls to be accepted, and 12.2% for males in 1984. Between 1984 and 2003 the demand for women's higher education was greater than men's, and the percentage of entrees shifted upward. In 2001, the "National Report on Women's Status in the Islamic Republic of Iran" included educational matters for women, like curriculum issues, management positions and academic quotas; in 2002 - 2003 women had the regular access to all courses except engineering. In 2002, the percentage of female students compared to male students in the tertiary education increased from 37.4% to 100.5% and in the same year almost the majority of women in academies (from 26.8% to 49%) were hired as assistant professors.

Moreover, the advantage of women's higher education decrease underdevelopment, backwardness, and compensation. The other factors that motivate women to obtain higher education are justice and equality in society, increase girl knowledge, participation in the social culture and politics, and change the traditional attitudes. Due to higher education, women were involved in decision-making because of their knowledge. Lastly, the general purpose of girls obtaining higher education is for social status, and before the Islamic revolution, higher education was basically for wealthy women and women from royal families. On the other hand, education was the only factor to upgrade women's social status because they wanted to further themselves and be involved in economics and politics after the Islamic revolution and anti-shah rallies. Another factor that motivates girls' education is the increase in the age of marriage. Thus, women's education has a greater demand, then they could get involved in private and public investment findings jobs. As women progress in higher education, they get more involved in the labor market argued by Kelli.  However, the percentage of women in the labor market is very low, and organizations, governmental and nongovernmental prioritize men. Even though there was changes in economic, social, cultural, and political there still is gender stereotyping. In addition, the number of educated women increased, but there still remains a problem with unemployment in the labor market for women. Finally, when it comes to education and employment, there is no relationship between girls' education and employment, and 50% of graduated students have jobs, which unrelated to their studies.

Role in economy

Since the 1970s, Iran has experienced significant economic and social changes. Women's workforce participation rate went from 9.1 percent in 1996 to 14 percent in 2004 to 31.9 in 2009. That is a 22.8 percent increase in 13 years. Women make up over half of the Iranian population, yet they only make up a small percentage of the workforce. Official statistics reported by the Census Bureau suggest that women's labor force participation remains quite low. Despite this, while women make up almost 30 percent of the Iranian labor force, and the percentage of all Iranian women who are economically active has more than doubled from 6.1 percent in 1986 to 13.7 percent in 2000. In 2004, there were 18 million people employed in Iran, Women made up only 12.9 percent (or roughly 2,160,000) of the employed population. Men, on the other hand, made up 64 percent, or roughly 11,520,000. The ILO data, however, suggest that female unemployment has been consistently higher than men's in recent years (Olmsted). Women are concentrated in the typically female jobs of teaching and caring. 82.7 percent of female civil servants work in teaching and education followed by administrative, financial, clerical, health, and medical professions. However, according to the International Labour Organization, the top three areas of female employment are agriculture, manufacturing, and education. One factor in the increase in women's employment is an increase in their literacy rates. The illiteracy among women has been a decrease from 1970 when it was 54 percent to the year 2000 when it was 17.30 percent. Iranian female education went from a 46 percent literacy rate to 83 percent. Iran ranked 10th in terms of female literacy in the 1970s, and still holds this position today. Women's labor force participation rate and literacy rate have been on the rise. Yet the unemployment rate for women compared to that of men is still considerably higher. Take, for example, that in 1996, the unemployment rate for women was 13.4 percent whereas, for men, the unemployment rate was 8.4 percent. The unemployment rate for both men and women has increased since 1996, with the gender gap in unemployment still present. In 2008 for example, male unemployment was 9.1 percent and female was 16.7 percent

Studies concerning female labor force participation vary. One factor to this is the difference between measurements. The Iranian Census provides one measurement for labor force participation, and the Labor Force survey provides another. The Iranian census for example, used different ages for the cut off age, 10 for the 1976 census, and used 6 for the 1986 census (Olmsted)  While the International Labour Organization uses 15. The World Bank and International Labour Organization have different data on recent female employment; the ILO reports an employment rate of 17.1 percent which is considerably higher than that of the World Bank. Overall, there seems to be a common upward trend in employment over time.

Women in Iran had previously been restricted to the private sphere, which includes the care of the home and the children, they have been restricted from mobility, and they needed their husband's permission in order to obtain a job. Employers depict women as less reliable in the workforce as opposed to men. However, the Islamic Revolution had some influence in changing this perception. Secular feminists and the elite were not happy with the revolution, while other feminists such as Roksana Bahramitash argue that the revolution did bring women into the public sphere. The 1979 Revolution had gained widespread support from women who were eager to earn rights for themselves. A woman's responsibility and obligation was in the home, which was the underlying basis of the Islamic Republic. Olmsted adds to this by stating that women have this "double burden". In addition, men had the right to inhibit their wives from entering the labor force. Ali Akbar Mahdi is in agreement with Parvin Ghorayshi in that through the domestication of women and confinement to the private sphere, they were being exploited in non-wage activities. In Karimi's viewpoint, after the revolution, even though it had been accepted on paper that women had an equal right to employment, she believed that this did not show in practice.  Comparing the pre-revolution and post-revolution era, between 1976 and 1986, the labor force participation of women had declined immensely from 12.9 percent down to 8.2 percent. In addition, during the 1990s, women were being compensated for their housework due to the domestic wage law which allowed women to demand compensation from their husbands for their housework in the event of a divorce.

In 1979 the United States imposed an economic boycott on Iran, which has affected many of their economic sectors. In particular, the boycott affected the carpet industry. As a result, the boycott influenced women's participation in the labor force.  Weaving is a common occupation for women, as it can be done inside the family home. If the market is volatile, merchants can simply remove or add looms to the worker's home in response to demand. Therefore, women who have children to take care of can be inside the home while tending to their work. Carpet weaving was very common among women from rural areas. Thus, carpet weaving was a valuable method of increasing the economic involvement of women in rural neighborhoods.  In 1996, over 91 percent of the female industrial employees were in the textile industry which consisted largely of carpet weaving. Nonetheless, this all changed due to sanctions. Before the Islamic Revolution, Iranian firms were combined with firms in the United States where Iranians produced rugs for the United States market. However, due to the United States inflicting sanctions on Iran, Iranian imports were banned from the country. The demand for Iranian carpets was still high. In response, Americans bought carpets with Iranian designs from other countries that produced the same carpets, such as China and India. From 1994 to 2005 the export of carpets had declined drastically. In 1994 Iran sold over $2 million worth of carpets, but by 2005 it went to under $500 in carpet exports. In other words, the total share of carpet in non-oil exports had declined from 44.2 percent to 4.2 percent; a drastic decrease. Olmsted concurs with Moghadam this would drastically affect women in the labor market, since the majority of carpet weavers consisted of less-educated women.

Entrepreneurship

According to the 2012 Global Entrepreneurship Monitor report, the rate of entrepreneurship in Iran for women between the ages 18 to 64 fluctuated from 4 to 6 percent between 2008 and 2012 while their overall economic participation makes up only 13 percent of the entire economy.

Iranian women's movement

The movement for women's rights in Iran is particularly complex within the scope of the political history of the country. Women have consistently pushed the boundaries of societal norms and were continually gaining more political and economic rights. Women heavily participated at every level of the revolution. Within months of the formation of the Islamic republic by Ruhollah Khomeini many important rights were repealed, but in mid-1980s replaced by a far more protective laws.

After the constitutional Revolution (1905-1906), the fall of the Qajar dynasty and the ascension to the throne of the Pahlavi dynasty, Iranian women decided to experiment with state-feminism. The new sovereign decided that he would have followed the same principles as the Turkish president Atatürk; forcefully eliminating the obligation to wear the veil and opening the access to universities for women.

During Reza Shah Pahlavi's reign the feminist movement grew stronger. Though they never achieved their main goal, universal suffrage.

During Reza Shah Pahlavi's son, Mohammad Shah, reign Iranian women managed to gain access to the newborn Communist party Tudeh and some of these activists founded parallel alloys still fighting for the right to vote that they managed to obtain in 1962.

After a short attempt made by the prime minister Mossadegh to overthrow him he regained his place as leader and decided to review some articles in family law: in 1967 divorce became a legal procedure that had to be carried out only in court and the minimum age for marriage became 18.

In 1978/1978 the regime was overthrown by the people and women played an important part in the accomplishment of the Revolution.

After this the already modified family law was modified again reinstating the minimum age for marriage at 13.

Under the presidency of Mohammad Khatami (1997-2005) feminist movements are on the rise. The president was in fact elected thanks to their support.
In 2003, Shirin Ebadi, Iran's first female judge in the Pahlavi era, won the Nobel Peace Prize for her efforts in promoting human rights.

In 2005 president Khatami was replaced by the conservative Mahmud Ahmadinejad.

In 2009 before the spring elections numerous organisations for example Madraseh-ye Feminist decided to team up to present a united front to the 4 candidates to ask for a betterment in women's conditions.

In the same year the Green Movement was founded, the principal original and important element is the feminsit leadership. This movement started off as a pro-democracy revolt guided mainly by women who were part of the urban middle class.

The president was re-elected and this meant that women's conditions were going to be overlooked. The day of the result of the elections women protested and in particular one of these became the symbol of women's right movement; this woman was Neda Agha-Soltan.

During the last few decades, Iranian women have had a significant presence in Iran's scientific movement, art movement, literary new wave and the new wave of Iranian cinema. According to the research ministry of Iran, about 6 percent of full professors, 8 percent of associate professors, and 14 percent of assistant professors were women in the 1998–99 academic year. However, women accounted for 56 percent of all students in the natural sciences, including one in five Ph.D. students. In total 49.8 percent of the university students in Iran are women.

With the 2005 election of President Mahmoud Ahmadinejad, Western media said that women's rights declined. After Ahmadinejad's re-election in 2009, the first female minister was appointed.

In 2022 the Green Movement became fully political and achieved a frontal position creating a new simbology able to help comprehend important definitions.

Iranian women's day
Every year, people in Iran commemorate the national Women's Day and Mother's Day on the 20 Jumada al-Thani, which marks the birthday anniversary of Fatima Zahra (often referred to as a role model), Muhammad's daughter and the wife of Imam Ali. Many Iranians take the occasion of this holiday to thank and honor their mothers, grandmothers, wives and sisters and to spend more time with them. They pay tribute to them by giving them gifts.

Veil in Iranian society

Pre-Islamic period
A major part of one's cultural identity is their clothing. For many centuries, since ancient pre-Islamic times, the female headscarf was a normative dress code in the Greater Iran. First veils in region are historically attested in ancient Mesopotamia as a complementary garment, but later it became exclusionary and privileging in Assyria, even regulated by social law. Veil was a status symbol enjoyed by upper-class and royal women, while law prohibited peasant women, slaves and prostitutes from wearing the veil, and violators were punished. After ancient Iranians conquered Assyrian Nineveh in 612 BC and Chaldean Babylon in 539 BC, their ruling elite has adopted those Mesopotamian customs. During the reign of ancient Iranian dynasties, the veil was first exclusive to the wealthy, but gradually the practice spread and it became standard for modesty.

Islamic period
Later, after the Muslim Arabs conquered Sassanid Iran, early Muslims adopted veiling as a result of their exposure to the strong Iranian cultural influence.

This general situation did change somewhat in the Middle Ages after the arrival of the Turkic nomadic tribes from Central Asia, whose women did not wear headscarves. However, after the Safavid centralization in the 16th century, the headscarf became defined as the standard head dress for the women in urban areas all around the Iranian Empire. Exceptions to this standard were seen only in the villages and among the nomads, so women without a headscarf could be found only among rural people and nomadic tribes(like Qashqai). Veiling of faces, that is, covering the hair and the whole face was very rare among the Iranians and was mostly restricted to the Arabs (niqab, battula and boushiya) and the Afghans (burqa). Later, during the economic crisis in the late 19th century under the Qajar dynasty, the poorest urban women could not afford headscarves due to the high price of textile and its scarcity. Owing to the aforementioned historical circumstances, the covering of hair has always been the norm in Iranian dress, and removing it was considered impolite, or even an insult. In the early 20th century, the Iranians associated not wearing it as something rural, nomadic, poor and non-Iranian. The use of veils provided women with a level of moral satisfaction. It was very ideal for women to be seen wearing these veils because they were viewed  as proper

During the Pahlavi dynasty

The use of veils began to be publicly challenged by women in the mid 19th century. Women such as Tahereh QorratolAyn, Huda Sha'arawi and Saiza Nabarawi unveiled themselves in public and created a political and religious controversy. Woman argued that being forced to wear the veil was a violation of their freedom and even a symbol of their inferiority.

Attempts at changing dress norms (and perspectives toward it) occurred in mid-1930s when pro-Western autocratic ruler Reza Shah banned Iranian women from wearing the veil entirely. 
Many types of male traditional clothing were also banned under the pretext that "Westerners now wouldn't laugh at us". 
Many of Iran's leading feminists and women's rights activists organized in the Kanun-e Banuvan to campaign in favor of the Kashf-e hijab.

To enforce this decree, the police were ordered to physically remove the veil from any woman who wore it in public. Women who refused were beaten, their headscarves and chadors torn off, and their homes forcibly searched.

Until Reza Shah's abdication in 1941, many conservative women simply chose not leave their houses in order to avoid confrontations, and a few even committed suicide to avoid removing their hijabs due to the decree.  A far larger escalation of violence occurred in the summer of 1935, when Reza Shah ordered all men to wear European-style bowler hats. This provoked massive non-violent demonstrations in July in the city of Mashhad, which were brutally suppressed by the Imperial Iranian army, resulting in the deaths of an estimated 100 to 500 people (including women and children).

Some Western historians have stated that the reform would have been a progressive step if women had initiated it themselves, but that the method of banning it humiliated and alienated many Iranian women, since its effect was, because of the effect of traditional beliefs, comparable to a hypothetical situation in which European women were suddenly ordered to go out topless into the street. Some historians have pointed out that Reza Shah's ban on veiling and his policies were unseen in Atatürk's Turkey. The ban lasted for five years; from 1936 until 1941.

Under next ruler Mohammad Reza Pahlavi, wearing of the veil or chador was no longer an offence, and women were able to dress as they wished.  
However, under his regime, the chador became a hindrance to climbing the social ladder, as it was considered a badge of backwardness and an indicator of being a member of the lower class. Veiled women were assumed to be from conservative religious families with limited education, while unveiled women were assumed to be from the educated and professional upper- or middle class.  The veil became a class marker; while the lower classes started to wear the veil again, the upper classes no longer wore the veil at all, while professional middle-class women such as teachers and nurses appeared unveiled in their work place, but sometimes veiled when they returned home to their families.

A few years prior to the Iranian revolution, a tendency towards questioning the relevance of Eurocentric gender roles as the model for Iranian society gained ground among university students, and this sentiment was manifested in street demonstrations where many women from the non-veiled middle classes put on the veil and symbolically rejected the gender ideology of Pahlavi regime and its aggressive deculturalization. Many argued that veiling should be restored to stop further dissolution of the Iranian identity and culture, as from an Iranian point of view the unveiled women are seen as exploited by Western materialism and consumerism. 
Wearing of headscarf and chador was one of main symbols of the revolution along with the resurgence and wearing of other traditional Iranian dresses. Headscarves and chadors were worn by all women as a religious and/or nationalistic symbols, and even many secular and Westernized women, who did not believe in wearing them before the revolution, began wearing them, in solidarity with the vast majority of women who always wore them. 
Wearing headscarves and chadors was used as a significant populist tool and Iranian veiled women played an important rule in the revolution's victory.

Mandatory veiling under Islamic Republic

After the Islamic Revolution, the policy inherited from the Kashf-e hijab was turned around. Instead of being forced to remove their veil, women were now subjected to the reversed ban against unveiling, and the veil were now enforced upon all women. The non-conservative women, who had worn the veil as a symbol of opposition during the revolution, had not expected veiling to become mandatory, and when the veil was first made mandatory in February 1979 it was met with protests and demonstrations by liberal and leftist women, and thousands of women participated in a women's march on International Women's Day, 8 March 1979, in protest against mandatory veiling. The protests resulted in the temporary retraction of mandatory veiling.

When the left and the liberals were eliminated and the conservatives secured solitary control, however, veiling was enforced on all women.  This began with the 'Islamification of offices' in July 1980, when unveiled women were refused entry to government offices and public buildings, and banned from appearing unveiled at their work places under the risk of being fired.  On the streets, unveiled women were attacked by revolutionaries, and two slogans of the revolution were: "Wear a veil, or we will punch your head" and "Death to the unveiled". In July 1981, an edict of mandatory veiling in public was introduced, which was followed in 1983 by an Islamic Punishment Law, introducing a punishment of 74 lashes on unveiled women. The law was enforced by members of the Islamic Revolution Committees patrolling the streets, and later by the Guidance Patrols, also called the Morality Police.

Since hijab was legally imposed on all Iranian women in 1984, post revolutionary Iranian women's fashion has seen Iranian women attempt to work within the narrow confines of the Islamic modesty code, with the typical attire gradually evolving from the standard black chador to a rousari (simple headscarf) combined with other colorful elements of clothing. In 2010, 531 young females (aged 15–29) from different cities in nine provinces of Iran participated in a study the results of which showed that 77 percent prefer stricter covering, 19 percent loose covering, and only 4 percent do not believe in veiling at all. A tendency towards Western dress correlated with 66 percent  of the latest non-compliance with the dress-code. In Tehran, police will no longer arrest any women seen violating modest code but will instead be fined or given classes by the police.

Compulsory hijab protests 
There have been many changes in Iran's society in the years since the revolution, often referred to as the "generation gap". This gap is overreaching and affects issues such as lifestyle, familial relationships, politics, and religion. For many of the young women one topic gaining popularity is the issue of the veil. After the 1979 revolution, the Hijab became compulsory as well as modesty requirements; loose-fitting clothing as well as a Rusari (headscarf) that covers all the hair. There has also been a rise in baddhi-jab, or girls who wear the legal requirements but not to the letter of the law, often having the majority of their hair showing. Many young urban Iranian women claimed that they are becoming less traditional. Many view their clothing style as a personal choice include the choice to veil. Issues and protests against the veil became symbolic as resistance against the Islamic regime.

Masih Alinejad in 2015 launched My Stealthy Freedom, which encouraged Iranian women to post pictures without their hijab. After December more than 35 protesters were arrested in just Tehran. The reaction from the government has been severe; police have stated that any women that participate in demonstrations against compulsory hijab could face up to 10 years in prison. The situation had become more tense in April after a video was shared showing a woman being slapped by a female member of Gast-e-Ersade (morality police) for wearing a loose headscarf. This incident also drew international attention to the issues Iranian women were facing.

The Gasht-E-Ershaad (also known as the Guidance Patrol) is a part of Iranian Islamic religious police, which is tasked with enforcing Iran's headscarf and dress code laws. They have the authority to chastise and even arrest women who do not conform to dress "modesty tests".

Women who are arrested for demonstrating against compulsory hijab claim that they are held in solitary confinement and subjected to torture and beatings. Protests against compulsory hijab continued with the response becoming larger. In December 2017 and January 2018, several women took off their headscarves to protest. These women became known as "the Girls of Revolution Street". One of "the Girls of Revolution Street", Vida Movahedi, was arrested for crimes against public morals, encouraging corruption and prostitution, and was sentenced to a year in prison. Punishment is given out to not only those who protest but also those who defend them; Nasrin Sotoudeh, an Iranian human rights lawyer who defended women who were being prosecuted for protesting compulsory hijab, was sentenced to 38 years in prison and 148 lashes. She was tried on the charges of assembly and collusion against national security, propaganda against the state, membership in various human rights groups, encouraging corruption and prostitution, appearing at the judiciary without Islamic hijab, disturbing public peace and order, and publishing falsehoods with the intent to disturb public opinion.  Protests have continued to occur where on May 13, 2019, there was a vast peaceful protest of both male and female students on the campus of Tehran University, but they were assaulted by other protesters who were chanting "Students may die, but we will not tolerate indignity". This protest was created to bring together Iranians in order to show their frustration with the government and an effort to receive change that has been sought for a long time. The protest turned violent when Iranian officers became involved.

In June 2018, Iranian human rights lawyer Nasrin Sotoudeh, who represented women arrested for removing their headscarves, was arrested and sentenced to 38 years in prison and 148 lashes for national security-related offenses. She is one of the seven human rights lawyers arrested in Iran in 2018.

On 16 September 2022, a 22-year-old Iranian woman named Mahsa Amini was arrested for alleged wearing her Hijab improperly and later died after according to eyewitnesses, she had been severely beaten by religious morality police officers. Amini's death received global attention and became a symbol of violence against women under the Islamic Republic of Iran, sparking a series of anti-compulsory hijab protests across the world. At least 481 protesters including 64 minors killed (Iran Human Rights) as of January 9, 2023. The protests have been "nationwide, spread across social classes, universities, the streets [and] schools", and called the "biggest challenge" to the government of Iran since the Islamic Revolution in 1979. The protests soon shaped the "Women, Life, Freedom" movement, with notable protesters such as Nika Shakarami, Sarina Esmailzadeh, Hadis Najafi, Khodanur Lojei and Kian Pirfalak being the well-known faces of the movement.

Women in Iranian culture

Persian literature

Over the past two centuries, women have played a prominent role in Persian literature, however, it mostly remained predominantly male-focused. The literary work of women was repressed for many years and even denied to them. Contemporary Iranian poets such as Simin Behbahani, Forough Farrokhzad, Parvin Etesami and Mina Assadi  have helped in the inclusion of woman literature in Iran. Simin Behbahani has written passionate love poems as well as narrative poetry enriched by a motherly affection for all humans. She has been an advocate for individual rights regardless of anyone's gender, class or religion. In addition, Behbani does not compete in her literature but instead writes and empowers both man and woman. Behbahani is president of The Iranian Writers' Association and was nominated for the Nobel Prize in literature in 1997.

Contemporary authors include Simin Daneshvar, Mahshid Amirshahi, Shahrnush Pârsipur, Moniru Ravânipur and Zoya Pirzad to name a few. Daneshvar's work spans pre-Revolutionary and post-Revolutionary Iranian literature. Her first collection of short stories, Âtash-e khâmush (Fire Quenched), was published in 1948. It was the first collection of short stories published by a woman in Iran. In 1969, she published Savushun (Mourners of Siyâvash), a novel that reflected the Iranian experience of modernity during the 20th century. It was the first novel published by a woman in Iran. Daneshvar was the first president of the Iranian Writers' Association. Shahrnush Pârsipur became popular in the 1980s following the publication of her short stories. Her 1990 novel, Zanân bedûn-e Mardân (Women Without Men), addressed issues of sexuality and identity. Many people criticized her work for being too outspoken and because she challenged many traditional views such as sexual oppression, virginity, and sexuality.  As a result, it was ultimately banned by the Islamic Republic. Moniru Ravânipur's work includes a collection of short stories, Kanizu (The Female Slave), and her novel Ahl-e gharq (The People of Gharq). Ravânipur is known for her focus on rituals, customs, and traditions of coastal life.

Iranian music

Perhaps Qamar ol-Molouk Vaziri was the first female master of Persian music who introduced a new style of music and was praised by other masters of Persian music of the time. Several years later, Mahmoud Karimi trained women students—Arfa Atrai, Soosan Matloobi, Fatemeh Vaezi, Masoomeh Mehr-Ali, and Soosan Aslani—who later became masters of Persian traditional music. Soodabeh Salem and Sima Bina developed Iranian children's music and Iranian folk music respectively.

Innovations made by Iranian women are not restricted to Persian music. For instance, Lily Afshar is working on a combination of Persian and Western classical music.

Googoosh is one of the most famous Iranian singers. Her legacy dates back to pre-Revolutionary times in Iran, where her fame in Iran reached heights equivalent to Elvis Presley or Barbra Streisand. She became iconic when, after the 1979 Iranian Revolution, she lived unheard of for more than 20 years. In 2000, she emerged from Iran with an international tour.

Modern art

Iranian women have played an important role in gaining international recognition for Iranian art and in particular Iranian cinema.

Since the rise of the Iranian New Wave of Persian cinema, Iran has produced record numbers of film school graduates; each year more than 20 new directors, many of them women, make their debut films. In the last two decades, the percentage of Iranian film directors who are women has exceeded the percentage of women film directors in most Western countries. The success of the pioneering director Rakhshan Bani-Etemad suggests that many women directors in Iran were working hard on films long before director Samira Makhmalbaf made the headlines. Internationally recognized figures in Persian women's cinema are Tahmineh Milani, Rakhshan Bani-Etemad, Zahra Dowlatabadi, Niki Karimi, Samira Makhmalbaf, Mahin Oskouei, Pari Saberi, Hana Makhmalbaf, Pouran Rakhshandeh, Shirin Neshat, Sepideh Farsi, Maryam Keshavarz, Yassamin Maleknasr, and Sara Rastegar.

Iranian writer-director Rakhshan Bani-Etemad is probably Iran's best known and certainly most prolific female filmmaker. She has established herself as the elder stateswoman of Iranian cinema with documentaries and films about social pathology. One of the best-known female film directors in the country today is Samira Makhmalbaf, who directed her first film, The Apple when she was only 17 years old. Samira Makhmalbaf won the 2000 Cannes Jury Prize for Blackboards, a film about the trials of two traveling teachers in Kurdistan.

In Persian literature one can find references to women as far back as Pre-Islamic times.

And many creators of classical verse and prose were women themselves as well. One can mention Qatran Tabrizi, Rabia Balkhi, Táhirih, Simin Behbahani, Simin Daneshvar, Parvin E'tesami, Forough Farrokhzad, Mahsati and Mina Assadi in this group to name nine of them.

Western perceptions of Iranian women
In Western democracies, there is a general view of women in modern Iran and the Islamic World writ large as victims of a patriarchal system that oppresses and enslaves them. Such a perspective was criticized by Ayatollah Khomeini, who argued:

Also, negative perceptions about foreign women are common inside Iran, where American and Western women are frequently seen as "commodified" objects of male desire.

See also

Andaruni
Women's rights in Iran
Iranian women's movement
List of Iranian women
List of Iranian women artists

References

women and politics in Iran: Veiling, Unveiling, and Reveiling.
Hamideh Sedghi, "Women and Politics in Iran", New York: published 2007

^Higher Education of women in Iran: Progress or Problem
Heshmat Sadat Moinifar. "Higher Education of Women in Iran: Progress or Problem?".
International Journal of Women's Research,1,1,2012, 43-60

Further reading
Persian Women & Their Ways Clara Colliver Rice. 1923. Seeley, Service & Co.
Voices from Iran: The Changing Lives of Iranian Women. Mahnaz Kousha. Syracuse University Press. 2002.
Veils and Words: The Emerging Voices of Iranian Women Writers. Farzaneh Milani. Published 1992 by I.B.Tauris
Piyrnia, Mansoureh. Salar Zanana Iran. 1995. Maryland: Mehran Iran Publishing.
Brosius, Maria. Women in Ancient Persia, 559–331 B.C. Oxford Classical Monographs. Oxford University Press (UK), 1998.
Farman Farmaian, Sattareh. 1992. Daughter of Persia: A Woman's Journey from Her Father's Harem Through the Islamic Revolution. New York: Three Rivers Press.
 Najmeh Khalili Mahani, Women of Iranian Popular Cinema: Projection of Progress, Offscreen, Vol. 10, Issue 7, July 31, 2006, .

External links

IranDokht'] – A comprehensive portal and magazine
Iran Electoral Archive – Women in Politics 
Iranian Women Resources
Qajar Women Archive, a digital archive of primary-source materials related to the lives of women during the Qajar era (1786–1925) in Iran. The Harvard University Library (HUL) central infrastructure accommodates and catalogs the archive.
WOMEN'S EDUCATION IN THE QAJAR PERIOD, Encyclopædia Iranica[https://iranicaonline.org/articles/education-xxvi-womens-education-in-the-pahlavi-period-and-after WOMEN'S EDUCATION IN THE PAHLAVI PERIOD AND AFTER, Encyclopædia Iranica''
Women of IRAN'''] , Social Documentary photos of Behrouz Reshad
 History of Iranian Photography. Women as Photography Model: Qajar Period'', photographs provided by Bahman Jalali, Iranian Artists' site, [https://web.archive.org/web/20071011111127/http://kargah.com/history_of_iranian_photography/qajarwomen/index.php?other=1 Kargah

 
Iran
Iran